Ashley is an unincorporated community in Doddridge County, West Virginia, United States.

The community was named in honor of the local Ash family.

References

Unincorporated communities in Doddridge County, West Virginia
Unincorporated communities in West Virginia